Charles Boyle Roberts (April 19, 1842 – September 10, 1899) was a U.S. Congressman from Maryland, serving the second district from 1875 to 1879.

Roberts was born in Uniontown, Maryland, and graduated from Calvert College of New Windsor, Maryland, in 1861.  He studied law, and was admitted to the bar in 1864, commencing practice in Westminster, Maryland.  He was elected as a Democrat to the Forty-fourth and Forty-fifth Congresses (March 4, 1875 – March 3, 1879), and was chairman of the Committee on Accounts (Forty-fourth and Forty-fifth Congresses).  He was elected Attorney General of Maryland in 1883, serving one term.  He was elected associate judge of the fifth judicial district in 1891.  He was soon thereafter appointed chief judge of the district to fill the vacancy caused by the death of Judge Miller, and, in 1893, was elected for the full term of 15 years.  Roberts died in Westminster in 1899, and is interred in the Catholic Cemetery.

References

1842 births
1899 deaths
Maryland state court judges
Maryland Attorneys General
People from Carroll County, Maryland
Democratic Party members of the United States House of Representatives from Maryland
People from Westminster, Maryland
19th-century American politicians
19th-century American judges